The  was an army of the Imperial Japanese Army during the final stages of World War II.

History
Afterwards, it was transferred to the operational control of the Japanese Sixth Area Army, and continued in its role as a garrison force for Wuhan and the surrounding region. In March 1945, it participated in counter-insurgency operations with the IJA 12th Army and in June was transferred to the operational control of the Kwantung Army. The following month, it completed a transfer from China to Hamhung, in northern Korea, where it was assigned border patrol during against possible incursions by the Soviet Union into Korea and part of southern Manchukuo. It was overrun by the Soviet Red Army during the Soviet invasion of Manchuria at the end of World War II.

List of commanders

Commanding officer

Chief of staff

References

Books

External links

34
Military units and formations established in 1944
Military units and formations disestablished in 1945